Gepiu is a commune located in Bihor County, Crișana, Romania. It is composed of two villages, Bicaci (Mezőbikács) and Gepiu. These were part of Cefa Commune until 2003, when they were split off.

References

Communes in Bihor County
Localities in Crișana